Paul Schommer (born 6 June 1992) is an American biathlete who represented the United States at the 2022 Winter Olympics. His first world cup podium finish was a silver finish in 2019 for the men's 10 km sprint competition at Obertilliach.

References

External links
 Paul Schommer Website

Living people
1992 births
American male biathletes
Sportspeople from Appleton, Wisconsin
Biathletes at the 2022 Winter Olympics
Olympic biathletes of the United States
21st-century American people